Joseph Cloud (August 27, 1770 – July 3, 1845) held the office of melter and refiner at the U.S. Mint at Philadelphia Mint from 1797 to 1836.

Life 

He was born on August 27, 1770, the eldest son and third child of Abner Cloud and his wife Mary née Pyle. His parents had married c. 1760 and his father was descended from William Cloud, originally of Calne, Wiltshire, who purchased land in the future Concord township in 1682. Cloud was appointed melter and refiner at the Philadelphia Mint by President George Washington in January 1797, and held the post until he resigned in 1836, owing to poor eyesight. 

Cloud was elected a member of the American Philosophical Society in Philadelphia.

He then resided at Radnor until his death on July 3, 1845. He was succeeded in his post at the mint by Franklin Peale.

References 

1770 births
1845 deaths